A Galactic Alliance is a galactic polity spanning part or all of a galaxy.

It may refer to:

 Galactic Federation of Free Alliances (aka Galactic Alliance), a Star Wars Expanded Universe LEGENDS-timeline polity, that follows after the destruction of the New Republic
 Pan Galactic Alliance, a galactic polity found in Teenage Mutant Ninja Turtles (2003 TV series)
 Galactic Alliance, the commanding polity of Star Command, in the Pixar property Buzz Lightyear of Star Command
 Galactic Alliance, a fictional alien polity found in the Disney franchise Lilo & Stitch (franchise)
 Galactic Alliance, a humankind polity found in the anime series Gargantia on the Verdurous Planet
 Galactic Alliance, a multi-galaxy polity found in and setting of the SF RPG Battlelords of the 23rd Century
 Galactic Space Alliance, a galactic polity found in Power Rangers: Lost Galaxy

See also

 List of fictional galactic communities
 Galactic Republic Alliance, a fictional polity from the tokusatsu TV show Ultraman 80, see List of Ultraman 80 characters
 
 Alliance (disambiguation)
 Galactic (disambiguation)
 Galactic Empire (disambiguation)
 Galactic Federation (disambiguation)
 Galactic republic (disambiguation)